Jungfernbach may refer to:

 Jungfernbach (Ahne), a river of Hesse, Germany, tributary of the Ahne
 Jungfernbach (Esse), a river of Hesse, Germany, tributary of the Esse